Helen Donis-Keller is the Michael E. Moody Professor and Professor of Biology and Art at Olin College of Engineering in Needham, Massachusetts.

Education and career 
Donis-Keller has a B.Sc. and an H.B.Sc. from Lakehead University. She earned her Ph.D. at Harvard University under the direction of Walter Gilbert in 1979. After employment at the biotechnology companies Biogen and Collaborative Research, she joined the faculty at Washington University School of Medicine. In 2001, she earn an MFA in studio art from the School of the Museum of Fine Arts in Boston and Tufts University and she joined the faculty at the Olin College of Engineering. In 2012, she was named the Michael. E. Moody Faculty Chair.

Research 
Donis-Keller's graduate research established a method to do RNA sequencing. During her time at Collaborative Research, her research group created the first genetic map of the human genome. Donis-Keller was unable to secure either NIH or venture funding for generating the RFLP map, but convinced Collaborative Research's management to fund the project. She continued to work on the genetic linkage map and led research into understanding the genetic basis of cystic fibrosis, thyroid cancer, and breast cancer.

Selected publications

Awards 
Doctor of Science Degree (Honoris Causa) from Lakehead University (1995)

Art 
In addition to teaching art at Olin, Donis-Keller is herself an artist, and her art can be seen at Needham's 2021 Open Studios event and other venues. Her Ph.D. advisor, Walter Gilbert, has also begun to investigate the intersection between art and science though, in a 2015 interview, Donis-Keller did not recall his interest in art while she was a student in his lab.

References

External links 
 

Year of birth missing (living people)
American geneticists
Harvard University alumni
Olin College faculty
Washington University in St. Louis faculty
Lakehead University alumni
American women artists
American women geneticists